My True Love, My Wound is a 1987 French drama film directed by José Pinheiro.

Cast 
 Stéphane Ferrara - Patrick
 Catherine Wilkening - Catherine
 Véra Gregh - The director
 Véronique Barrault - Clementine
 Jacques Castaldo - Jean-Ba
 Philippe Manesse - Julien
 Jacky Sigaux - Jacky
 Mouss Diouf - Mouss

External links 

1980s erotic drama films
French erotic drama films
1987 drama films
1987 films
Films directed by José Pinheiro
1980s French films